Tristan Sturrock (born 1967) is a British theatre, television and film actor. He has worked with the theatre company Kneehigh for 30 years. He played the role of Zacky Martin in Poldark in all five seasons, which aired from 2015 to 2019 in the UK. He has performed in many productions including Brief Encounter on Broadway and Mayday, Mayday, an autobiographical solo project which he wrote and performed internationally.

Early life and career
Tristan Sturrock was born in 1967 and raised Upton Cross, Cornwall.

Sturrock's career commenced in theatre in 1986 when he joined the international touring theatre group, Truro-based Kneehigh Theatre. Throughout his stage career, he has played leading roles on Broadway, the West End and the National Theatre. He starred as Dr. Alec Harvey in Brief Encounter which is perhaps one of his most notable performance. Sturrock has played leading roles in many productions including Peter Carter in A Matter of Life and Death, at the National Theatre (Olivier), The Riot (National). He played Tristan in the first cast of Emma Rice's acclaimed Tristan and Yseult, (National Theatre Cottesloe) which toured to Sydney and New Zealand and the US. He played the title role in The King of Prussia (Donmar Warehouse) and in 2015 played Maxim De Winter in Rebecca also directed by Emma Rice.

Other Kneehigh work includes Tregeagle, Ship of Fools, Peer Gynt, The Ashmaid, Danger My Ally, Windfall and Don John. Other notable theatre work includes roles at the Royal Shakespeare Company including The Spanish Tragedy and The Mysteries. He played Orlando in As You Like It at The Royal Exchange Theatre directed by Marianne Elliot.

Sturrock first appeared on television in 1996 when he had a guest role on the British detective series Wycliffe. Following this, he made appearances on Liverpool 1, The New Adventures of Robin Hood, The Bill, Rescue Me, Holby City and The Royal. In 2002, Sturrock was cast in the role of Officer Colin Hedges on the ITV prison drama series Bad Girls (Series 5, 6 and 7). In 2000 he was cast as Harvey Sloggit in the feature film Saving Grace. He also played Harvey, Martin Clunes' sidekick in the spin-off movies for Doc Martin and Doc Martin and the Legend of the Cloutie (2003), which were prequels to the TV series. He returned to Doc Martin to play Danny Steel, Louisa Glasson’s ex in 2005. The character returned in 2015. Roles followed in Garrow's Law, The Borgias, the television film The Best of Men and The Queen (Channel 4) where he played Peter Townsend. He played Doctor Bernard Gould in Endeavour (2016) and John Wheeler-Bennett in season 2 of The Crown (2017). In 2014 he was cast as Cornish miner and series regular Zacky Martin in Poldark.

Sturrock is an associate artist at Bristol Old Vic Theatre where he played Long John Silver in Sally Cookson's Treasure Island and in her critically acclaimed Peter in Peter Pan (Christmas 2012) He played Pongo in 101 Dalmatians (Tobacco Factory). He also played the Friar in Tom Morris's Juliet and her Romeo.

Sturrock is the co-artistic director of Bristol-based company Theatre Damfino with his partner Katy Carmichael. His autobiographical solo piece Mayday Mayday which he wrote and performed; was based on the true events of an accident in which he broke his neck and the months it took him to recover whilst raising awareness for the spinal injury charity, Aspire. The first showing premiered in Edinburgh (2012) where it won the International Fringe Review Award and was selected by artistic director Susan Feldman to play at St Ann's Warehouse, New York (2013). It went on to play at the Spoleto International Theatre Festival, South Carolina. Mayday Mayday was also adapted as an afternoon play for BBC Radio 4 by Becky Ripley and was broadcast on 1 May 2015. The Radio play won the International Third Coast award (US) was nominated for two BBC Drama awards 2016 -  best sound design and a finalist for best drama production. Other Damfino work includes The Table Of Delights (Bristol Old Vic) winner of an Off West End award 2016 in best production for families category. (Print Room Theatre London).

Personal life
Sturrock is married to actress and director Katy Carmichael, with whom he has three children; a son (born 2004) and two daughters (born 2006 and 2010).

In May 2004, Sturrock broke his neck after falling from a wall during the 'Obby 'Oss festival in Padstow, Cornwall. He was airlifted to the Derriford Hospital in Plymouth. He underwent an operation three weeks following the accident and it took him several weeks to learn how to walk again. After a three-month stay in hospital, Sturrock was discharged to his parents' home in Bodmin Moor and attended physiotherapy sessions as an outpatient and twelve months later, he had made a remarkable improvement, however, nerve damage left him with permanent numbness in his fingers, arms, shoulders, and feet.

Filmography

References

External links
 Official site 
 

1968 births
Living people
Male actors from Cornwall
British male actors
British male television actors
Date of birth missing (living people)